The 41st Assembly District of Wisconsin is one of 99 districts in the Wisconsin State Assembly.  Located in central Wisconsin, the district comprises most of Marquette County, as well as the northern half of Green Lake County and the southern half of Adams County, and parts of northwest Columbia County and southeast Waushara County.  The district includes the cities of Adams, Berlin, Green Lake, Portage, Princeton, and Wisconsin Dells, as well as the villages of Friendship, Lake Delton, Neshkoro, Oxford, and Westfield.  It also contains the Dells of the Wisconsin River State Natural Area, Mirror Lake State Park, Summerton Bog, the Mt. Olympus Water & Theme Park, and the Noah's Ark Water Park.  The seat is represented by Republican Alex Dallman since January 2021.

The 41st Assembly district is located within Wisconsin's 14th Senate district, along with the 40th and 42nd Assembly districts.

List of past representatives

References 

Wisconsin State Assembly districts
Adams County, Wisconsin
Fond du Lac County, Wisconsin
Green Lake County, Wisconsin
Marquette County, Wisconsin